Argus was a Norwegian debate show hosted by Mona Høiness, that aired on TV3.

In the summer of 1993 Høiness threatened to quit her job as a host in protest of TV3 airing the show Bikini, an American show featuring scantily-clad women on a podium surrounded by cheering men. Høiness didn't want that kind of entertainment on a channel with which she was associated. Shortly after TV3 decided to cancel Bikini.

References

Hvor ble det av tv-jentene? (Norwegian)

TV3 (Norway) original programming
Norwegian television talk shows
1993 Norwegian television series debuts
1994 Norwegian television series endings
Debate television series
1990s Norwegian television series